Brézé was the name of a noble Angevin family. The founder and most famous member of the family was Pierre de Brézé (c. 1410–1465), one of the trusted soldiers and statesmen of Charles VII. He was succeeded as seneschal of Normandy by his eldest son, Jacques de Brézé (c. 1440–1490), count of Maulevrier; and then by his grandson, Louis de Brézé (died 1531), husband of the famous Diane de Poitiers, whose tomb in Rouen Cathedral, attributed to Jean Goujon and Jean Cousin the Elder, is a splendid example of French Renaissance work.

The lordship of Brézé passed eventually to Claire Clémence de Maillé, Princess of Condé, who sold it to Thomas Dreux, who took the name of Dreux-Brézé when it was erected into a marquisate. Henri Evrard, marquis de Dreux-Brézé (1762–1829) succeeded his father as master of the ceremonies to Louis XVI in 1781. He died on 27 January 1829, when he was succeeded in the peerage and at court by his son Scipion (1793–1845).

Notable members of the Brézé family
 Pierre de Brézé
 Louis de Brézé, seigneur d'Anet (grandson of Pierre)
 Claire Clémence de Maillé Brézé
 Jean Armand de Maillé-Brézé (brother of Claire Clémence)
 Urbain de Maillé-Brézé (1597 – February, 13 1650), Marshal of France, Marquis de Brézé

See also
 Château de Brézé
 Maillé-Brézé (disambiguation)

References
 

French noble families
Surnames